Coston is a village and former civil parish, now in the parish of Brandon Parva, Coston, Runhall and Welborne, in the South Norfolk district, in the county of Norfolk, England. The village is divided from nearby Runhall by the River Yare. In 1931 the parish had a population of 33.

History
Coston's name is of joint Anglo-Saxon and Viking origin and derives from an amalgamation from the Old English and Old Norse for Karr's farmstead or settlement.

Coston does not feature in the Domesday Book.

The principle building, now hidden by mature trees, is the mid-13th century church of St. Michael. Its dilapidated state was noticed in the 18th century, but subsequent repairs took place with some success. It is now under the care of the Churches Conservation Trust and is a stopping off point for the Barnham Broom and Upper Yare remembrance trail.
and the north eastern side of the bridge looks towards Coston Fen.

Two businesses that are accessible to the public operate in Coston. A booking only fishing venue (carp) at Coston Day Ticket Fishing Lake and the Coston Hall Dairy where raw milk can be purchased.

On 1 April 1935 the parish was abolished and merged with Runhall.

Gallery

References

Villages in Norfolk
Former civil parishes in Norfolk
South Norfolk